Kriya Yoga (Sanskrit: क्रिया योग) is described by its practitioners as an ancient yoga system revived in modern times by Lahiri Mahasaya, who claimed to be initiated by a guru, Mahavatar Babaji, circa 1861 in the Himalayas. Kriya Yoga was brought to international awareness by Paramahansa Yogananda's book Autobiography of a Yogi and through Yogananda's introductions of the practice to the west from 1920. 

The Kriya yoga system consists of a number of levels of pranayama, mantra, and mudra, intended to rapidly accelerate spiritual development and engender a profound state of tranquility and God-communion.

Etymology
In Kriya Yoga pranayama, kriya refers to revolving the life energy "upward and downward, around the six spinal centers." According to Yogananda, "Kriya is an ancient science. Lahiri Mahasaya received it from his great guru, Babaji, who rediscovered and clarified the technique after it had been lost in the Dark Ages. Babaji renamed it, simply, Kriya Yoga." According to David Gordon White, "while [Yogananda] called his particular Kriya Yoga, the term used for "practical yoga" in Yoga Sutras 2.1-27, Patanjali's work is conspicuously absent from his writings."

History

Lahiri Mahasaya
The origins of the present day forms of Kriya Yoga can be traced back to Lahiri Mahasaya, who reported to have received initiation into the yoga techniques from an elusive, immortal Indian yogi saint, commonly referred to as Mahavatar Babaji, who supposedly lived in the second century CE. The story of Lahiri Mahasaya receiving initiation into Kriya Yoga by Mahavatar Babaji in 1861 is recounted in Autobiography of a Yogi. Yogananda wrote that at that meeting, Mahavatar Babaji told Lahiri Mahasaya, "The Kriya Yoga that I am giving to the world through you in this nineteenth century, is a revival of the same science that Krishna gave millenniums ago to Arjuna; and was later known to Patanjali, and Christ, and to St. John, St. Paul, and other disciples." Yogananda also wrote that Babaji and Christ were in continual communion and together, "have planned the spiritual technique of salvation for this age."

Through Lahiri Mahasaya, Kriya Yoga soon spread throughout India. Lahiri Mahasaya's disciples included his two sons, Dukouri Lahiri and Tinkouri Lahiri, Sri Yukteswar Giri, Panchanan Bhattacharya, Swami Pranabananda, Swami Kebalananda, Keshavananda Brahmachari, Bhupendranath Sanyal (Sanyal Mahasaya), and many others .

Paramahansa Yogananda
Kriya Yoga was brought to international awareness by Paramahansa Yogananda, a disciple of Swami Sri Yukteswar Giri, with his book Autobiography of a Yogi and through Yogananda's introductions of the practice to the west from 1920.

Practice

Kriya Yoga, as taught by Lahiri Mahasaya, is traditionally exclusively learned via the Guru-disciple relationship and the initiation consists of a secret ceremony. He recounted that after his initiation into Kriya Yoga, "Babaji instructed me in the ancient rigid rules which govern the transmission of the yogic art from Guru to disciple."

As Yogananda describes Kriya Yoga, "The Kriya Yogi mentally directs his life energy to revolve, upward and downward, around the six spinal centers (medullary, cervical, dorsal, lumbar, sacral, and coccygeal plexuses) which correspond to the twelve astral signs of the zodiac, the symbolic Cosmic Man. One half-minute of revolution of energy around the sensitive spinal cord of man effects subtle progress in his evolution; that half-minute of Kriya equals one year of natural spiritual unfoldment."

The process of performing Kriya Yoga is claimed to lead to a certain purification of the blood which frees up the life force to withdraw into the spine. "Kriya Yoga is a simple, psycho-physiological method by which the human blood is decarbonized and recharged with oxygen. The atoms of this extra oxygen are transmuted into life current to rejuvenate the brain and spinal centers. By stopping the accumulation of venous blood, the yogi is able to lessen or prevent the decay of tissues; the advanced yogi transmutes his cells into pure energy. Elijah, Jesus, Kabir and other prophets were past masters in the use of Kriya or a similar technique, by which they caused their bodies to materialize and dematerialize at will."

Swami Satyananda wrote "Kriya sadhana may be thought of as the sadhana of the 'practice of being in Atman'.

There are many higher kriyas in the kriya yoga tradition. According to the Autobiography of a Yogi, Lahiri Mahasaya divided Kriya Yoga into four parts. The second, third and the fourth Kriya are known as higher Kriyas, Thokar Kriya being one of them.

Sources and inspirations
According to Yogananda, the elusive Mahavatar Babaji introduced the concept of Kriya Yoga pranayama as essentially identical to the Raja Yoga of Patanjali and the concept of Yoga as described in the Bhagavad Gita. 
According to Yogananda, Kriya Yoga was well known in ancient India, but was eventually lost, due to "priestly secrecy and man’s indifference".

A direct disciple of Sri Yukteswar Giri, Sailendra Dasgupta (d. 1984) has written that, "Kriya entails several acts that have evidently been adapted from the Gita, the Yoga Sutras, Tantra shastras and from conceptions on the Yugas."

Bhagavad Gita
The Bhagavad Gita does not teach Kriya Yoga pranayama by name, though Yogananda claimed that the practice was described there. According to Paramahansa Yogananda in his book God Talks with Arjuna: The Bhagavad Gita, Krishna describes kriya Yoga thus:

Yogananda also stated that Krishna was referring to Kriya Yoga pranayama when "Krishna ... relates that it was he, in a former incarnation, who communicated the indestructible yoga to an ancient illuminato, Vivasvat, who gave it to Manu, the great legislator. He, in turn, instructed Ikshwaku, the father of India’s solar warrior dynasty."

Yoga Sutras of Patanjali

Yoga Sutras 2.1.
According to Yogananda, "Kriya Yoga is mentioned twice by the ancient sage Patanjali, foremost exponent of yoga, who wrote: "Kriya Yoga consists of
body discipline, mental control, and meditating on Aum."—Yoga Sutras II:1."

The Yoga Sutras of Patanjali 2.1 actually uses the term kriya yoga when describing a "yoga of action (kriyayoga)," defining three types of kriya (action):

According to George Feuerstein, this kriya yoga is contained in chapter 1, chapter 2 verse 1-27, chapter 3 except verse 54, and chapter 4. The "eight limb yoga" is described in chapter 2 verse 28–55, and chapter 3 verse 3 and 54.

According to Miller, Kriya yoga as described in the Yoga Sutras is the "active performance of yoga." It is part of the niyamas, "observances", the second limb of Patanjali's eight limbs.

Yoga Sutras 2.49
Yogananda stated that Patanjali wrote a second time about the Kriya Yoga pranayama technique when he wrote: "Liberation can be attained by that pranayama which is accomplished by disjoining the course of inspiration and expiration" (YS 2.49).

Dissimilar traditions
The Bihar School of Yoga, which teaches similar techniques of Kriya Yoga pranayama, states that the descriptions of kriya yoga in the Yoga Sūtras and the Bhagavad Gīta are not related.

Guru-shishya parampara of Kriya Yoga 
The lineage of Self-Realization Fellowship (SRF)/Yogoda Satsanga Society of India (YSS), founded by Paramahansa Yogananda includes Jesus Christ,  Bhagavan Krishna, Mahavatar Babaji, Lahiri Mahasaya, Sri Yukteswar Giri and Paramahansa Yogananda. According to SRF, Yogananda stated, before his passing, that it was "God's wish that he be the last in the SRF line of Gurus." When questioned about the succession of SRF/YSS leadership, Yogananda answered, “There will always be at the head of this organization men and women of realization. They are already known to God and the Gurus. They shall serve as my spiritual successor and representative in all spiritual and organizational matters.”

According to the Kriya Yoga Institute, their lineage includes Mahavatar Babaji, Lahiri Mahasaya, Sri Yukteswar Giri, Shrimat Bhupendranath Sanyal Mahashaya, Paramahansa Yogananda, Satyananda Giri, Hariharananda Giri

See also
 Khecarī mudrā
 Samadhi

Notes

References

Sources

Further reading

External links

Meditation
Modern Denominational Yoga
Paramahansa Yogananda
Spiritual practice
Kriya yogis
Yoga concepts
Yoga
Intangible Cultural Heritage of Humanity
Indian inventions
Hindu philosophy
Bhagavad Gita
Yoga schools